Cui Yining (born 5 May 1956) is a Chinese fencer. He competed in the épée and foil events at the 1984 Summer Olympics.

References

External links
 

1956 births
Living people
Chinese male épée fencers
Olympic fencers of China
Fencers at the 1984 Summer Olympics
Asian Games medalists in fencing
Fencers at the 1978 Asian Games
Asian Games gold medalists for China
Medalists at the 1978 Asian Games
Chinese male foil fencers
21st-century Chinese people
20th-century Chinese people